USS LST-1064 was an  in the United States Navy. Like many of her class, she was not named and is properly referred to by her hull designation. She was later named Nansemond County, but never saw active service under that name.

Construction
She was laid down on 9 January 1945, at Hingham, Massachusetts, by the Bethlehem-Hingham Shipyard; launched on 14 February 1945; and commissioned on 12 March 1945.

Service history
Following a shakedown in the Chesapeake Bay area, LST-1064 loaded a cargo of ammunition at Naval Weapons Station Earle, New Jersey, and sailed for the Pacific war front, reaching Ulithi, on 23 June 1945. As the end of the war approached, LST Group 99 advanced its operations to the Philippines, and at Leyte, LST-1064 transferred her cargo to fleet ships while loading new supplies and embarking units of an air service group destined to strengthen the occupation forces in Japan. Two voyages to Yokohama, took place between 4 October and 19 November, before arrival of orders to return home.

LST-1064 spent Christmas 1945 at Saipan; New Year's Day on the high seas, and before the end of January 1946, liberty in California. After one year of service, inactivation commenced at Astoria, Oregon,  culminating on 21 August, when LST-1064 was fully decommissioned and laid up in the Pacific Reserve Fleet, Columbia River Group.

She was named Nansemond County''' on 1 July 1955, after Nansemond County, Virginia, then was slated for disposal on 17 September 1959.

 Japanese service 
The ship was purchased by Japan in April 1961, under the terms of the Military Assistance Program and sailed as the Japanese Maritime Self Defense Force's Shiretoko. In 1975, she was returned to the United States.

 Philippines Service 
The ship was next transferred to the Philippines on 24 September 1976, and served in the Philippine Navy as Samar Del Norte, after the province of Northern Samar.

 Notes 

Citations

 Bibliography Online resources'''

External links
 

 

LST-542-class tank landing ships
Ships built in Hingham, Massachusetts
1945 ships
World War II amphibious warfare vessels of the United States
LST-542-class tank landing ships of the Japan Maritime Self-Defense Force
LST-542-class tank landing ships of the Philippine Navy
Pacific Reserve Fleet, Astoria Group